Cadwallader is a given name and surname of Welsh origin. Notable people with the name include:

Surname
Abel G. Cadwallader (1841–1907), American Civil War soldier awarded the Medal of Honor
Alice A. W. Cadwallader (1832-1910), American philanthropist and temperance activist
Douglass Cadwallader (1884–1971), American golfer
Gavin Cadwallader (born 1986), English football player
Robyn Cadwallader, Australian author
W. Ray Cadwallader (born c. 1932), American politician
Stan Cadwallader, husband of Jim Nabors

Given name
Henry Cadwallader Adams (1817–1899), English cleric, schoolmaster and novelist
Cadwallader John Bates (1853–1902), English historian and antiquarian
Cadwallader Blayney, 10th Baron Blayney (1769–1784), Irish lord
Cadwallader Blayney, 12th Baron Blayney (1802–1874), Irish nobleman and politician
Cadwallader Colden (1688–1776), Scottish-American physician, natural scientist, and politician
Cadwallader D. Colden (1769–1834), American politician
Cadwallader Owen (c. 1562–1617), Welsh Anglican clergyman
Cadwallader C. Washburn (1818–1882), American businessman, politician and soldier
Cadwallader Lincoln Washburn (1866–1965), American artist and war correspondent
Cadwallader Jackson Wiltse (1823–1900), American politician
Cadwallader Wolseley (1806–1872), Irish Anglican priest

Other
Algernon Cadwallader, American emo band

See also
Cadwallader (disambiguation)
Cadwalader (disambiguation)
Cadwaladr (name)

Welsh-language surnames
Welsh masculine given names